Eastyle is a Taiwanese boy band that does street dancing, Hip hop and R&B.
They were first heard on the radio with the song 'You are My Most Loved Person' (你是我最深愛的人), which was written by the composer - Yong Bang (永邦), but was sung a cappella.

They were first in a group called 貝格斯Beggars with other friends that all had a passion for street dancing. After stopping for about a year, they came up with a new name for their group consisting of 4 members - Eastyle (翼勢力).

The four members of the group are: David (Ah Mei), Casper (Xiao Cao), Javin (Qiu Fan) and Micky (Yuan Tai).

Members 
   David  
 Real Name: Xiao Sheng Jie (萧聖傑)
 Nickname: Ah Mei (ㄚ美), Ames
 Role: RAP, Song Writer, Beat-Box, Breaking
   Casper 
 Real Name: Dong Wei Lun 董偉倫
 Name: Xiao Cao (小草)
 Role: Group Leader, Lead Singer, Music Composer, Breaking
  Micky  
 Real Name: 袁振銓
 Name: Yuan Tai (元太)
 Role: Lead Singer, Middle Vocalist
  Javin 
 Real Name: Hui Qiu Fan (許秋凡)
 Name: Qiu Fan (秋凡)
 Role: Beat-Box, Teaching members basic dance moves

Discography

Albums 
 EaStyle's First Album (翼勢力同名專輯)
 Released: December 22, 2006
 Label: SYARTS entertainment (神翼國際)
 Freestyle
 雨 (Rain)
 藍絲絨 (Blue Velvet)
 Sha La La
 舞道 (Dance)
 你是我最深愛的人(Unplugged) (You are My Most Loved Person)
 Beggars
 秋月風 (Autumn Wind)
 Don't Say Goodbye
 闇黑神翼
 记忆拼图 (Memory Pieces)

References 
 http://www.hitoradio.com/music/1a_3_1_1_1.php?artist_id=3943
 http://www.g-music.com.tw/event/Eastyle20070109/eastyle2.html

External links
 (Chinese) G-Music - EaStyle, 
 (Chinese) EaStyle's Official Website, 
 (Chinese) EaStyle @ Wretch Blog, 
 (Chinese) EaStyle @ Yahoo Blog, 
 (Chinese) EaStyle's Blog, 
 (Chinese) EaStyle Videos, 

Taiwanese boy bands